The women's heptathlon event at the 2018 African Championships in Athletics was held on 4 and 5 August in Asaba, Nigeria.

Medalists

Results

100 metres hurdles

High jump

Shot put

200 metres
Wind: ? m/s

Long jump

Javelin throw

800 metres

Final standings

References

2018 African Championships in Athletics
Combined events at the African Championships in Athletics